Beneteau is the name of the high-end acoustic guitars built by Marc Beneteau in South-Western Ontario, Canada since 1974.

External links
 Beneteau Guitars Website
 Interview with Marc Benetau on Guitarbench.com
Manufacturing companies based in Ontario
Guitar manufacturing companies
Canadian companies established in 1974